The 2004 Tampa Bay Buccaneers season was the franchise's 29th season in the National Football League (NFL), the 7th playing their home games at Raymond James Stadium, and the 3rd under head coach Jon Gruden.

This season began with the team trying to improve on their 7–9 record in 2003, but they fell even further to a 5-11 record and missed the playoffs for the second straight season. Brian Griese set a number of franchise records for passing. Michael Clayton set a rookie record for receiving.

The Bucs acquired Hall of Fame wide receiver Tim Brown, who was well known for his tenure with the Raiders. After his only season in Tampa Bay, Brown decided to hang it up after 17 seasons. They also acquired former Seattle Seahawks and Dallas Cowboys wide receiver Joey Galloway in a trade for Keyshawn Johnson.

Summary

Offseason
Before the 2004 training camp, personnel issues and the salary cap became primary concerns. Gruden successfully lobbied the Glazers to hire his former general manager from Oakland, Bruce Allen. After Allen's arrival in the Buccaneers' front office, the team announced that it would not re-sign two of their notable defensive players (John Lynch and Warren Sapp). Both of their contracts were expiring, and younger players would fill their positions. Lynch was released after medical exams indicated ongoing injury problems. Many Buccaneers fans were stunned by the move, as Lynch was a very popular player whose aggressive, intelligent play earned him several Pro Bowl appearances.  He was also well regarded for his philanthropic work in the Tampa-area.  Lynch was quickly signed by the Denver Broncos, where he had consecutive injury-free Pro Bowl seasons.  Sapp signed with the Oakland Raiders, where he played in a limited role in 2004, and sat out much of the 2005 season with injuries but returned to form in 2006.  Since wide receiver Keenan McCardell refused to play until he was given a better contract or traded, he was sent to the San Diego Chargers for draft compensation.

Tampa Bay's free agent signings in 2004 included a number of expensive and aging players meant to jumpstart Gruden's offense. These players included tackle Todd Steussie, running back Charlie Garner and tackle Derrick Deese. The 32-year-old Charlie Garner signed a reported $20-million contract with a $4-million signing bonus but only played 3 games before going on IR, he would never play again. Todd Steussie was often injured while Derrick Deese only played for the team for one year before retiring.

Preseason
In August, Hurricane Charley brought training camp to a screeching halt. The Buccaneers' first preseason game was also postponed (from Saturday to Monday) due to the storm. After returning to Disney's Wide World of Sports Complex, it was determined that the soaked fields and disrupted schedule was too much to overcome. The team broke camp over a week early, and returned to Tampa. A "rump" week of camp took place at the team facilities, and at the same time, some players and team officials tended to damaged homes in the wake of the storm.

Regular season
The distracted Buccaneers began the 2004 season with a 1–5 record, their worst start since 1996. The fading accuracy of kicker Martin Gramatica did not help matters and he was cut after week 12, as the team lost many close games en route to a 5–11 record. The Buccaneers became the first NFL team to follow up a Super Bowl championship with back-to-back losing seasons.  The lone highlights of 2004 were the high-quality play of rookie wide receiver Michael Clayton and the return of Doug Williams, who joined the Bucs front office as a personnel executive.

The Buccaneers finished their year under Jon Gruden with the 22nd ranked offense and the 5th ranked defense.

Staff

Roster

Preseason

Schedule

Standings

Game summaries

Week 1: at Washington Redskins

Opening day saw Tampa Bay visit Washington. In the second quarter, Brad Johnson threw deep for an apparent 29-yard touchdown pass to newly acquired wide receiver Joey Galloway. Galloway, was unable to secure the ball, and suffered a groin injury on the play. After a Martin Gramatica field goal, the Buccaneers entered halftime trailing 10–3.

Ronde Barber tied the score at 10–10 after he recovered a Mark Brunell fumble 9 yards for a touchdown. After an interception, Washington, managed two field goals in the fourth period, and held on to win 16–10.

Week 2: Seattle Seahawks

Brad Johnson struggled mightily, completing only 4-of-7 for 34 yards and one interception. Jon Gruden pulled Johnson after the first quarter and replaced him with second year player Chris Simms, to the delight of fans.

Simms drove the Buccaneers to the Seattle 1 yard line. Attempting a quarterback sneak on third-and-goal, Simms fumbled the snap. Tampa Bay settled for a field goal and a 10–3 halftime deficit. In the fourth quarter, another field goal narrowed the game to 10–6. With just over two minutes left, Simms drove the Buccaneers to the Seattle 26. The game ended, however, after he was intercepted with 1:11 to go.

Simms debut yielded mixed results; 175 yard passing, but no touchdowns, and two costly turnovers. The Buccaneers started the season 0–2.

Week 3: at Oakland Raiders

Tampa Bay traveled to Oakland, for a rematch of Super Bowl XXXVII on Sunday Night Football. The game saw the Buccaneers face former player Warren Sapp (who signed with Oakland in the offseason) for the first time. This game was being played while central Florida, including Tampa, was being impacted by Hurricane Jeanne.

Brad Johnson was back in place at starting quarterback, but his numbers were again mediocre. He threw two interceptions (one was returned for a touchdown). Trailing 30–6, Johnson managed two fourth quarter touchdown passes (Tampa Bay's first offensive touchdowns of the season), but the comeback stalled, and the Buccaneers started the season 0–3.

Also, Tim Brown, playing his swan song season in Tampa Bay, scored his 100th and final career touchdown against his old team, the Raiders.

Week 4: Denver Broncos

Tampa Bay's dismal start continued, as they dropped to 0–4 on the season. Brad Johnson connected with Michael Clayton for a 51-yard touchdown in the first half, but three Jason Elam field goals proved to be the winning edge for Denver.

Week 5: at New Orleans Saints

Tampa Bay broke a six-game losing streak (dating back to 2003), defeating the Saints 20–17. Slumping Brad Johnson was benched for the season, and Chris Simms started at quarterback. Simms' first NFL start was short-lived, however, as he left the game in the first quarter with a sprained shoulder. Brian Griese took over at quarterback, later connecting on a 45-yard touchdown to Ken Dilger, which proved to be the winning margin.

Week 6: at St. Louis Rams

Tampa Bay faced St. Louis on Monday Night Football for the fourth time in five seasons. A Michael Pittman fumble was returned 93 yards for a touchdown by Adam Archuleta, and Martin Gramatica missed two field goal attempts, sinking the Buccaneers' chances at victory.

With a final rating of 7.7, this was the lowest-ever rated MNF game on ABC.

Week 7: Chicago Bears

Michael Pittman rushed for 109 yards, and Brian Griese threw a touchdown pass as Tampa Bay prevailed over the visiting Chicago Bears.

Week 9: Kansas City Chiefs

The lone highlight game of Tampa Bay's forgetful 2004 season came against Kansas City in week 9. Brian Griese threw for 296 yards and two touchdowns, while Michael Pittman rushed for 128 yards on the ground.

Late in the first quarter, Trent Green connected to Eddie Kennison for a 59-yard gain to the Tampa Bay 11 yard line. Dwight Smith forced a fumble, and Brian Kelly returned the fumble 32 yards for the Buccaneers. The turnover led to a touchdown and a 14–7 lead.

Early in the third quarter, Pittman broke away for a 78-yard touchdown run, the longest in Buccaneer history. Tampa Bay took the lead 34–31 after another Pittman score with 12 minutes to go.

Jermaine Phillips sealed the game for Tampa Bay, intercepting Green with just under six minutes left. Kansas City had one final chance, but the Buccaneer defense forced a turnover on downs with only 1:15 to go.

Week 10: at Atlanta Falcons

Michael Vick rushed for 76 yards, and had 176 yard passing, as Tampa Bay fell to division rival Atlanta.

Week 11: San Francisco 49ers

Tampa Bay crushed the lowly 49ers 35–3. Brian Griese passed for 210 yards and two touchdown passes, and Michael Pittman rushed for 106 yards and two touchdown runs.

Tampa Bay won their fourth game out of the last six, and improved to 4–6 on the season.

Week 12: at Carolina Panthers

Brian Griese threw for 347 yards and two touchdowns, but mistakes cost the Buccaneers dearly, and they fell to Carolina 21–14.

A Griese interception was returned for a touchdown, and Martin Gramatica's kicking woes continued. He missed two field goal attempts during the game, which brought his season total to 8 misses.

Week 13: Atlanta Falcons

Kicker Martin Gramatica was benched for the season, and journeyman veteran Jay Taylor took his place. Tampa Bay crushed Atlanta 27–0, knocking Michael Vick out of the game for a play, forcing two fumbles, and one interception.

At 5–7, Tampa Bay found themselves only one game out of the NFC wild card hunt.

Week 14: at San Diego Chargers

Tampa Bay returned to San Diego for the first time since winning Super Bowl XXXVII, as Brian Griese threw for 392 yards, but four turnovers foiled Tampa Bay's chances for victory against the San Diego Chargers. Tied 21–21 with 4 minutes remaining, Griese's pass was intercepted and returned for a game icing touchdown.

Week 15: New Orleans Saints

Former Buccaneer Aaron Stecker returned the opening kickoff 98 yards for a touchdown (something he never accomplished playing for Tampa Bay) as New Orleans beat Tampa Bay 21–17. Tampa Bay fell to 5–9, guaranteed themselves of their second consecutive losing season, and effectively eliminated themselves from playoff contention.

The Buccaneers led 17–7 with just over 3 minutes to go, but late-game miscues on offense and defense sunk the Buccaneers. Aaron Brooks connected on two touchdowns in the final three minutes, lifting the Saints to victory.

Week 16: Carolina Panthers

Carolina routed Tampa Bay 37–20 in front of an only partially full Raymond James Stadium. Trailing 24–7, Brian Griese connected for two touchdown passes, but the comeback was for naught.

Week 17: at Arizona Cardinals

Chris Simms returned from injury to start his second game. A 75-yard touchdown pass to Michael Clayton gave the Buccaneers a 7–6 lead. Four turnovers, however, kept the game out of reach, and Tampa Bay lost to the four field goals by Arizona.

Tampa Bay started the season with 4 straight losses, ended the season with 4 straight losses, and finished a hapless 5–11.

Scores by quarter

Notes

References
BUCPOWER

Tampa Bay Buccaneers season
Tampa Bay Buccaneers
21st century in Tampa, Florida
Tampa Bay Buccaneers seasons